Tracy Memorial Village Hall Complex is a historic village hall located at Chatham, Columbia County, New York. It was built in 1912–1913, and is a two-story, rectangular brick building in a Classical Revival / Colonial Revival style.  It is topped by a hipped roof with cupola.  The front facade features a monumental Ionic order portico of grey marble.  Also on the property is the contributing firehouse (1925) and the H.F. Jenks Company Cup Fountain (1914) located in the Central Square.

It was added to the National Register of Historic Places in 2016.

References 

City and town halls on the National Register of Historic Places in New York (state)
Neoclassical architecture in New York (state)
Colonial Revival architecture in New York (state)
Government buildings completed in 1913
Buildings and structures in Columbia County, New York
National Register of Historic Places in Columbia County, New York